Taneyevka is a rural locality (a khutor) in Nizhnereutchansky Selsoviet Rural Settlement, Medvensky District, Kursk Oblast, Russia. Population:

Geography 
The khutor is located on the Reut River (a left tributary of the Seym), 61 km from the Russia–Ukraine border, 39 km south of Kursk, 5.5 km south of the district center – the urban-type settlement Medvenka, 5 km from the selsoviet center – Nizhny Reutets.

 Climate
Taneyevka has a warm-summer humid continental climate (Dfb in the Köppen climate classification).

Transport 
Taneyevka is located 2.5 km from the federal route  Crimea Highway (a part of the European route ), 32 km from the nearest railway halt 457 km (railway line Lgov I — Kursk).

The rural locality is situated 45 km from Kursk Vostochny Airport, 85 km from Belgorod International Airport and 222 km from Voronezh Peter the Great Airport.

References

Notes

Sources

Rural localities in Medvensky District